"The Race" is the 96th episode of the American sitcom Seinfeld, the tenth episode of the sixth season. The episode first aired on December 15, 1994. The story follows Jerry as he meets an old rival, who suspects that he cheated in a high school race and wishes to re-run it. Elaine is put on a "blacklist" and finds out her boyfriend is a communist. George responds to a personal ad in the Daily Worker and Kramer, who is working as a department store Santa Claus, is convinced to become a communist by Elaine's boyfriend.

"The Race" was one of Jerry Seinfeld's favorite episodes of Seinfeld due to its Superman themes.

Plot
Jerry is excited to be dating a woman named Lois, the same name as Lois Lane, as it gives him ample opportunity to do Superman impersonations. Lois works for Duncan Meyer, his high school rival. In a track race in ninth grade, Jerry got an inadvertent head start that nobody noticed, allowing him to win by a wide margin. Jerry's reputation for speed became legendary, but Duncan always suspected him of cheating, since he had outraced Jerry several times before. Jerry protected his legacy, over the next two decades, by refusing to race ever again.

Lois arranges lunch at Monk's with her, Jerry, and Duncan; realizing that Lois doesn't believe his claim that he legitimately won the race, he asks George to turn up at Monk's, pretend he has not seen Jerry since high school, and back up his winning story. Duncan is unconvinced, and demands that Jerry race him again, even threatening to fire Lois if he declines. Duncan calls up everyone from high school to come out for the race, and Jerry gets worried the legend will die. As the race is about to begin, Kramer's car backfires; Jerry (and the watching crowd) mistakes that for the starter's pistol, while Duncan waits for the real gun, giving Jerry another head start. Jerry wins the race, again by a wide margin, and cements his legacy while Duncan is left severely upset.

Elaine complains about her Chinese food delivery and refuses it, causing her to be blacklisted from Hop Sing's. George notes to Elaine that Ned, her new boyfriend, has a copy of the Daily Worker, which prompts suspicion of Ned being a communist. George is intrigued by one of the personal ads, which remarks, "Appearance not important." Ned admits to Elaine he is a communist, to her delight.

At Yankee Stadium, George receives a call from Natalie, the personal ad girl. His secretary, Ada, overhears the conversation and suspects George of communist sympathies. The rumor that George is a communist spreads to Steinbrenner, who is delighted: with a communist working for the Yankees, they can scout Cuban baseball players for the team.

Mickey gets Kramer a job as Santa Claus at Coleman's department store, with Mickey as his elf. At Coleman's, Ned gets Kramer interested in communism. Against Mickey's objections, Kramer (as Santa) tries to educate a child on communist beliefs and is accused of spreading communist propaganda; Kramer and Mickey are subsequently fired. Ned insists on ordering dinner from Hop Sing's, as his father spent much of his time at the restaurant after being blacklisted; despite her ban, Elaine calls and places the order in Ned's name. When the delivery man sees Elaine there, he blacklists Ned from the restaurant; horrified at Elaine for "naming names", Ned breaks up with her.

A week later in Cuba, George meets with Fidel Castro who lets him recruit any players and invites him to a luxurious dinner due to his supposed communist leanings. However, Castro, much like Steinbrenner, begins to ramble on about trivialities and George quietly exits.

Pop culture references
A recurring joke throughout Seinfeld is the references to Superman; the theme features prominently in "The Race". Jerry's line to Lois, "Faster than a speeding bullet, Lois," is a reference to the Superman series, Adventures of Superman. He also at one time says, "Why, I'd have to be Superman to do that, Lois." At the end of the episode, Jerry breaks the fourth wall and winks to the camera after he says, "Maybe I will, Lois. Maybe I will." This was the first and only instance of breaking the fourth wall in the series, excluding the retrospective "The Highlights of 100" and "The Chronicle". The wink towards the camera is a reference to the older Superman television series and Silver Age comics. Jerry's declaration "I choose not to run" is a reference to President Calvin Coolidge's statement "I do not choose to run". Cold War paranoia is lampooned through a young boy making "commie" accusations against Kramer, calling him a traitor, while Mickey tries to keep him quiet.

Production
The phone conversation between George and Natalie was ad-libbed by actor Jason Alexander, who performed almost completely different versions of the conversation in each of the scene's several takes.

Jerry Seinfeld tried wearing a brightly colored, skintight racing outfit for the climactic race scene, but co-creator Larry David and director Andy Ackerman both felt the outfit was excessive, so Seinfeld changed into normal wear.

The shooting script for the episode was 70 pages, as opposed to the usual 40–50 pages for a sitcom script, and the filmed content far exceeded the show's half-hour time slot. As such, numerous scenes were deleted, including an entire subplot showing how Kramer helped George obtain a visa so that he could get to Cuba. Other cuts included Kramer defending his skinny appearance in the role of Santa Claus.

References

External links
 

Seinfeld (season 6) episodes
1994 American television episodes
Cultural depictions of Fidel Castro
Television episodes written by Larry David